Ahmad Syahir (born 10 April 1992) is a Singaporean footballer who plays as a defender for Geylang International.

He started his career with the youth team of the Tiger in 2014.

Career statistics

Club

Notes

References

Living people
1992 births
Singaporean footballers
Association football goalkeepers
Singapore Premier League players